Ernests Blanks ( in Braslava, Valmiera County, Governorate of Livonia, Russian Empire – 31 January 1972 in Palma, Majorca, Spain), publicist, the first to publicly advocate for Latvia's independence in 1917.

Ernests Blanks was editorial writer of Dzimtenes Atbalss (Fatherland's Echo). At a time when others discussed Latvia's and, the other Baltic countries, autonomy, Ernests Blanks dared to demand sovereignty for Latvia. Already on  Ernests Blanks unequivocally wrote: "Our ideal is a sovereign Latvia." After the state of Latvia had been established he reminded that the Latvians had regained their long lost freedom. For some time he was a deputy of the first Parliament Tautas Padome, which preceded the Saeima. He wrote about the Saeima, but mostly about the Latvian National Awakening and its activists. He was one of them, although discreet about his own role. The author of about 700 editorials on Latvian national political issues (alone), and at least 15 books, several of which have appeared in 2nd and 3rd editions. Ernests Blanks devoted his life to defending the sovereignty of the state of Latvia with his pen. Thus, during the Latvian Soviet Socialist Republic, he was a persona non grata in his own fatherland.

Biography
His parents were leaseholders until the family moved to Riga where he attended school. Starting 1914 he studied history and philosophy at the Shanyavskiy University in Moscow as an unenrolled, external student. He was one of the leaders of the Latvian National Democratic Party (LNDP). In Latvia Ernests Blanks was editor of numerous newspapers and journals, and published papers in even more. Ernests Blanks was honoured with the Three-Star Order (of the 4th class) of Latvia in 1928. In 1945 Ernests Blanks fled in exile to Germany where he continued the editorial and publishing work. He died in exile January 31, 1972 in Palma de Mallorca, Spain.

References
 Uldis Ģērmanis (Transl. P. Lazda): The idea of independent Latvia and its development in 1917. Res Baltica. A collection of essays in honor of the memory of Dr. Alfred Bilmanis (1887–1948). Eds: A. Sprudzs, A. Rusis. Leyden, The Netherlands: A.W. Sijthoff, 1968, 27-87.
 Uldis Ģērmanis: Oberst Vācietis und die lettischen Schűtzen im Weltkrieg und in der Oktoberrevolution. Acta Universitatis Stockholmiensis, Stockholm Studies in History. Stockholm, Sweden: Almquist & Wiksell, 1974.
 Ernests Blanks: Editorials in Dzimtenes Atbalss, 1917, 30 (17) May; on 1917, 13 June (31) May; on 1917, 16 (3) June; on 1917, 11 July (28) June. Nr. 49; and on 1917, 21 (8) July. No. 52.
 Uldis Ģērmanis: Latvijas neatkarības idejas attīstība. Jaunā Gaita, 1966, 60, 33-34.
 Ernests Blanks: Latvju tautas ceļš uz neatkarīgu valsti. Västerås, Sweden: Ziemeļblāzma, 1970.
 Uldis Ģērmanis: Ernests Blanks – publicists un ideologs. Jaunā Gaita, 1972, 90, 52.
 Ādolfs Šilde: Latvijas vēsture 1914–1940. Valsts tapšana un suverēnā valsts. Stockholm, Sweden: Daugava, 1976.
 Latvijas Enciklopēdija. Riga: V. Belokoņs, 2002, 1, 705.
 Latviešu rakstniecība biogrāfijās. Riga: LU Literatūras, folkloras un mākslas institūts, Latvijas Enciklopēdija, 2003, 91-92.
 Latvijas Vēstures Institūta Žurnāls, Riga: 2008, 67 (2), pp. 47–60 (http://www.lvi.lv/lv/LVIZ.htm)

1894 births
1972 deaths
People from Limbaži Municipality
People from Kreis Wolmar
Latvian writers